Trébeurden is a commune in the Côtes-d'Armor department of Brittany in northwestern France.

Population
Inhabitants of Trébeurden are called trébeurdinais in French.

International relations
Trébeurden is twinned with:
 Vâlcelele, Buzău, Romania, since 1991
 Villanuova sul Clisi, Italy, since 2000
 Newton Ferrers, Devon, England, since 2010

See also
Communes of the Côtes-d'Armor department

References

External links

Official website 

Communes of Côtes-d'Armor
Seaside resorts in France